Aber-erch (Welsh for "Mouth of the Erch") is a small village and former civil parish on the Llŷn Peninsula in the Welsh county of Gwynedd. A river, the Afon Erch runs through the village.

The parish was abolished in 1934 and incorporated into that of Llannor, now the community of Llannor.  It is a mostly Welsh-speaking village.

There is a primary school, playschool, and a railway station. The church of St Cawrdaf is a grade I listed building.

Aber-erch has a beach which is between Pwllheli and Penychain (Haven Holiday Park). Parking for the beach is near the railway station.  From the beach you have a view of Harlech Castle in the east all the way down to Tywyn (on a clearer day even further south) and to the west Pwllheli and the St Tudwal's Islands. Access to the beach is through a footpath next the caravan and camp-site. This beach is ideal for days when the wind is from the north or north west due to the sheltered bay.

The ward includes the village of Y Ffor and the small settlement of Penrhos.

Notable people 
 John Elias (1774-1841), a powerful Christian preacher:  "as if talking fire down from heaven"
 Ellis Owen Ellis (1813-1861), a Welsh portrait painter, cartoonist and illustrator.

References

Villages in Gwynedd
Llannor